The 1970 Minnesota gubernatorial election took place on November 3, 1970. Minnesota Democratic–Farmer–Labor Party candidate Wendell Anderson defeated Republican Party of Minnesota challenger Douglas M. Head.

Results

External links
 Minnesota Secretary Of State - Home

Gubernatorial
1970
Minnesota
November 1970 events in the United States